Kimble is both a surname and a given name. Notable people with the name include:

People

Surname
Alan Kimble (born 1966), English football manager and retired player
Bo Kimble (born 1966), American retired college and National Basketball Association player
Darin Kimble (born 1968), Canadian retired National Hockey League player
Garry Kimble (born 1966), English football manager and retired player
George C. Kimble (1803–1836), a defender of the Alamo
H. Jeff Kimble (born 1949), professor of physics at the California Institute of Technology
Joseph Kimble (born 1949), emeritus law professor at Western Michigan University-Cooley Law School

Given name
Kimble Anders (born 1966), American retired National Football League fullback
Kimble Sutherland (born 1966), Canadian politician

Fictional characters
Richard Kimble, protagonist of the TV series The Fugitive and the 1993 film adaptation
Christine Campbell (character) (née Kimble), title character of the TV series The New Adventures of Old Christine, portrayed by Julia Louis-Dreyfus
Diana Kimble, her daughter Jessica Kimble and granddaughter Stephanie Kimble, in the Friday the 13th series
Elise Kimble, the alter ego of the third DC Comics Persuader
John Kimble, hero of the film Kindergarten Cop, played by Arnold Schwarzenegger
Kimble Hookstraten, a Republican Congresswoman in the ABC series Designated Survivor, starring Kiefer Sutherland

English masculine given names

fr:Kimble